Fang Shouxian (October 28, 1932 – January 19, 2020) was a Chinese physicist who served as President of the Institute of High Energy Physics, Chinese Academy of Sciences (CAS).

Biography
Fang was born in Shanghai, Republic of China, on October 28, 1932. After graduating from Fudan University in October 1955, he was assigned to the Institute of Modern Physics, Chinese Academy of Sciences (CAS). He worked in the Soviet Union between 1957 and 1960. After returning to China, he was again assigned to the Institute of Modern Physics. He joined the Communist Party of China on June 22, 1979. He served as vice-president of the Institute of High Energy Physics in 1986, and two years later was promoted to President. He died of illness in Beijing, on January 19, 2020.

Honours and awards
 November 1991 Member of the Chinese Academy of Sciences (CAS)

References

1932 births
2020 deaths
Chinese expatriates in the Soviet Union
Fudan University alumni
Members of the Chinese Academy of Sciences
Physicists from Shanghai